Kayalam  is a suburb of the Peruavayal Panchayath within the Kozhikode district in the Indian state of Kerala. Bordering Kayalam is the Chaliyar River and the Perumanna, Mavoor and Mundumuzhi villages. The Kavanakallu Regulator Bridge is near Kayalam.

Culture
Samskara poshini vayanasala and KASC kayalam are two organisations which encourage cultural and religious harmony in kayalam. Keleswaram sree Uma Maheswara Temple is an oldest temple in kayalam

Educational institutions
 Kayalam ALP School
 Islamic Center Public Nursery School
 Ideal Nursery School

Industries
Vimala Rubber Plantation, Kayalam
 Kayalam Brick Company

References

Villages in Kozhikode district